The BMW i3 sedan (model code G28 BEV) is a battery electric compact executive car produced by BMW since 2022 for the Chinese market. Part of the BMW i sub-brand, it is the battery electric version of the long-wheelbase 3 Series (G28), and reused the nameplate from the i3 hatchback. It was revealed in March 2022 in a single model called the i3 eDrive35L.

The G28 i3 features the latest Gen5 eDrive powertrain components used by the iX3, i4 and iX. It has a claimed  figure of 6.2 seconds.

References

i3
Cars introduced in 2022
Compact executive cars
Rear-wheel-drive vehicles
Production electric cars